Cornetto, meaning "little horn" in Italian, is an Italian brand of frozen dessert in the ice cream cone, which is manufactured and owned by parent company Unilever. Cornetto are sold as part of the Heartbrand product line, known internationally by different names, including Algida in Italy, Wall's in the UK, HB in the Republic of Ireland, Frigo in Spain, and Kwality Wall's in India. Several variations of the product exist, ranging from milk-based ice cream to vegetable fat-based dessert.

Manufacturing
For a long time, the idea of selling frozen ice-cream cones had been impractical, as the ice cream would soak into the moist cone during the manufacturing process and make it soggy and unpalatable when served. In 1959, Spica, an Italian ice-cream manufacturer based in Naples, overcame this problem by insulating the inside of the waffle cone from the ice cream with a coating of oil, sugar, and chocolate. In 1976 the patent was acquired  by Unilever, which began marketing the product in Italy through the Algida brand and abroad through other subsidiaries, including Wall's in the UK, HB in Ireland, Frigo in Spain and Kwality Wall's in India. They are sold in many different sizes throughout Europe in sizes ranging from 28-ml Miniatures to 260-ml King Cones, though the 90-ml and 125-ml sizes tend to be the most popular.

Varieties
The product is available in a variety of flavours, including Strawberry, Mint Chocolate, Nut, Lemon, Whippy (yogurt flavour with a chewy chocolate), Valentine's Day flavours, and Cornetto Soft (soft ice cream that comes in chocolate chip, cookie dough, vanilla, chocolate, and double chocolate). Cornetto Soft is sold on the street by vendors and is made on the spot with an ice cream dispenser, but the other flavours are premade and factory packaged. Also, Cornetto Enigma is made, which consists of cookies and cream, raspberry and double chocolate flavours.

Unilever introduced a Cornetto chocolate confectionery into the UK market in 2013, following a licensing deal with Kinnerton Confectionery.

Advertising campaigns

'O sole mio campaign
The brand was marketed in the United Kingdom, Ireland, and Brazil by successful advertising campaigns which placed the Neapolitan song "'O sole mio" into a variety of stereotypical Italian locations and situations, with its lyrics changed to:

Just one Cornetto,
give it to me,
delicious ice-cream, of Italy,
creamy vanilla and choco dream,
Give me Cornetto,
from Wall's ice cream.
(in the UK)

give it to me,
a big ol' nut and chocolate dream,
HB Cornetto
spells the best ice cream.
(in Ireland)

Dame un Cornetto
Molto crocante 
E più cremoso 
É da Gelato. 
Cornetto é da própria Itália. 
Ti voglio tanto,
Corneeeeetto mio!
(in Brazil)

In Britain and Ireland, the advertisements ran for 10 years during the 1980s and 1990s, with the song supposedly sung by former Italian waiter Renato Pagliari of one-hit wonders Renée and Renato. (However, this is claimed not to be the case by Pagliari's son, Remo.) In 2000, the Wall's Cornetto commercial was ranked 23rd in Channel 4's UK poll of "The 100 Greatest TV Ads". The theme resurfaced in 2006, this time sung by pedestrians, drivers, office workers, and marathon runners in Central London.

Other campaigns
In the Philippines, the "" campaign was launched in 2008, relying on humour and focused on the product's affordability, with skits that centre on things one cannot afford with 20 pesos and suggesting that the audience should buy a Cornetto instead. "" and "" were used as slogans for the campaign. 
By May 2011, 30 story-lines had been produced. In 2019, the price of Cornetto was 25 pesos (this was not always the case). But in 2020, it became 20 pesos again.

The television advertisement entitled "Tugs", which is part of the campaign, was selected as the Adobo Ad of the Year for 2010 through online voting at the ad agency band night "Lakihan Mo Logo 14".

See also
 Streets – Australian brand
 Drumstick – competitor by Nestlé
 Nutty Buddy – competitor formerly by Sweetheart Foods
Three Flavours Cornetto trilogy – a trilogy of films directed by Edgar Wright that briefly features the ice cream.

References

Products introduced in 1959
Ice cream brands
Unilever brands